Zdravko Juričko (29 March 1929 – 23 February 2012) was a Yugoslav footballer.

Club career
Born in Split, he played for HNK Hajduk Split in the Yugoslav First League. Then he moved to another Yugoslav top-flight side, OFK Beograd, known at that time as BSK, and he made 75 league appearances and scored 5 goals between 1953 and 1957. It was during that period that he became a regular at the Yugoslav B national team. Then he moved abroad to Switzerland.

References

1929 births
2012 deaths
Footballers from Split, Croatia
Association football midfielders
Yugoslav footballers
HNK Hajduk Split players
OFK Beograd players
Yugoslav First League players
Burials at Lovrinac Cemetery